Beryllium azide, is an inorganic compound. It is a beryllium salt of hydrazoic acid .

Synthesis
Beryllium azide has been synthesised by the reaction of beryllium chloride with neat trimethylsilyl azide:

Alternatively, dimethylberyllium reacts with hydrazoic acid in dry diethyl ether at −116 °C:

Structure
IR and Raman spectra suggest that beryllium azide consists of infinite chains, with tetrahedrally coordinated  ions linked by end-on bridging  ions.

References

Azides
Beryllium compounds